Emperor Xiaowu may refer to:

Emperor Xiaowu of Jin (362–396)
Emperor Xiaowu of Liu Song (430–464)
Emperor Xiaowu of Northern Wei (510–535)